Brachyaciura is a genus of tephritid  or fruit flies in the family Tephritidae.

Species
Brachyaciura kovacsi Bezzi, 1924
Brachyaciura rufiventris (Bezzi, 1918)
Brachyaciura limbata (Bezzi, 1924)

References

Tephritinae
Tephritidae genera
Diptera of Africa